Wayne LeRoy Kidwell (born June 15, 1938) is an American lawyer and jurist who is a retired Idaho Supreme Court justice, state attorney general, majority leader of the state senate. He was also an associate deputy attorney general in the administration of President Ronald Reagan.

Early life and education 
Born in Council, Idaho, Kidwell graduated from Boise High School in 1956. He attended the University of Idaho in Moscow, was a member of the Sigma Chi fraternity, and graduated in 1960 with a degree in pre-law. He spent a year in law school and then went on active duty with the U.S. Army, as an officer in the military police in New Jersey and South Korea. After his military service, Kidwell returned to the UI and earned a J.D. from its College of Law. During law school, he served for a summer as an aide to U.S. Senator Len Jordan.

Career 
After a few years representing insurance companies in Boise, Kidwell ran successfully for Ada County prosecutor. Two years later, Kidwell won a race for a seat in the Idaho Senate, and a year later became the majority leader. He ran for the congressional seat in 1972 that Jim McClure was vacating for the United States Senate, but lost in the Republican primary to Steve Symms and returned private legal practice for several years.

Idaho Attorney General 
In 1974, Kidwell defeated incumbent Idaho Attorney General Tony Park. He served one four-year term and considered a run for governor in 1978, but withdrew from the race in August 1977; he returned campaign donations, telling Idaho voters that he was taking a sabbatical to travel with his family.

Kidwell tried again for the congressional seat in 1980 vacated by Symms, but lost the primary to state senator  and then moved his family

Federal service 
After joining a notable firm in Hawaii as a partner, Kidwell in 1982 was appointed U.S. associate deputy attorney general, and he represented the Republic of the Marshall Islands as its appointed attorney general.

Idaho Supreme Court 
After returning to Idaho and working in private practice for close to a decade, Kidwell ran for the Idaho Supreme Court in May 1994 against incumbent Justice Cathy Silak and lost. Four years later, Kidwell ran again for an open seat and won a three-way race in May and the run-off in November; he was the second in Idaho history to win elections in all three branches of state government (after former Chief Justice Allan Shepard), and was sworn in on 

Kidwell served one full six-year term on the court and retired at age 66 in January 2005, succeeded by Jim Jones.

References 

Justices of the Idaho Supreme Court
Government ministers of the Marshall Islands
Idaho Attorneys General
Idaho state senators
Idaho lawyers
University of Idaho alumni
People from Boise, Idaho
People from Council, Idaho
1938 births
Living people
University of Idaho College of Law alumni